VantageScore is a consumer credit-scoring system in the United States, created through a joint venture of the three major credit bureaus (Equifax, Experian, and TransUnion). The model is managed and maintained by an independent company, VantageScore Solutions, LLC, that was formed in 2006 and is jointly owned by the three bureaus.

VantageScore models compete with the FICO score produced by Fair Isaac Corp. (FICO). Like the models developed by FICO, VantageScore models operate on data stored in the consumer credit files maintained by the three national credit bureaus. VantageScore models and FICO models use statistical analysis on those data to predict the likelihood a consumer will default on a loan. Both VantageScore and FICO models represent risk of loan default in the form of three-digit scores, with higher scores indicating lower risk, but VantageScore and FICO use different, proprietary analytical methods, and scores from one system cannot be translated into one from the other.

VantageScore vs FICO score
VantageScore and FICO are competitors, and FICO was not involved with the creation of VantageScore's formula.

VantageScore, FICO and the credit bureaus have allowed the public to know some information about the credit score categories and the corresponding calculation weights. FICO allows consumers to get their generic or classic FICO score for Experian, TransUnion, and Equifax through the myFICO website. Consumers can get their VantageScores from free credit report websites, and TransUnion and Experian offer VantageScores to consumers for a fee through their websites.

In contrast with FICO's credit scoring models, which are custom-built for each of the three national credit bureaus, to accommodate structural differences in the bureaus' databases, VantageScore model design allows a single model to operate on all three bureaus' data. VantageScore Solutions holds several patents on processes that ensure pieces of data within each bureau's consumer database will be treated identically, regardless of differences in database structure. These methods eliminate much, but not all, discrepancy in VantageScore scores obtained at the same time from different credit bureaus. Some variation is unavoidable because factors such as the timing of  lenders' payment-information reports can mean the contents of a given consumer's credit file will differ somewhat at each of the three credit bureaus.

Important differences between the VantageScore and FICO algorithms include:
 FICO scores require having at least one account that has been open for six months or more and has been reported to the credit bureaus within the prior six months, whereas the VantageScore can be issued from just one month’s credit history and with just one account reported within the prior two years. VantageScore thus captures consumers with little or thin credit histories;

 tax liens are weighed less heavily in VantageScore® 4.0 than in FICO scores;

 When a credit inquiry is made at one of the credit bureaus, it negatively impacts credit scores. Current versions of the FICO score treat multiple credit inquiries made within a 45-day period as if they were a single inquiry for scoring purposes (though some older versions of the FICO score restrict this to 14 days), but only if they are for the same type of loan. VantageScore counts multiple inquiries within a 14-day period as if they were a single inquiry, even if the inquiries are made for different types of loans.

 The older FICO 8 score, which is still often used as of 2020, treated medical debt like any other unpaid debt for scoring purposes; medical debt has less impact than other unpaid debt in the newer FICO 9 score and VantageScore 3.0 and forward.

Updates to VantageScore Model
The first two VantageScore models (VantageScore 1.0, issued in 2006, and VantageScore 2.0, released in 2010) used a scale range of 501 to 990, and assigned letter grades to various bands within that range, according to TransUnion:

A:  900–990 
B:  800–899 
C:  700–799 
D:  600–699 
F:  501–599

VantageScore 3.0, the version of the model released in 2013, adopted a scale of 300 to 850. VantageScore attributed the change, which matches the scale range used by FICO models, to the fact that consumers were more familiar with it than with the original VantageScore range, and because a 300-850 scale would make it easier for lenders to incorporate the VantageScore into automated systems.

VantageScore 4.0 was released in mid-2017, and contains many updates from 3.0. For example, version 4.0 weights medical accounts reported "in collection" less heavily than nonmedical collection accounts. Paid collection accounts of any type are not factored into the score; this is a major difference from FICO, since most versions of FICO count any collection account into the score, paid or unpaid. VantageScore 4.0 also looks at trended data provided by the credit bureau from which the score is calculated, and examines a consumer's credit utilization rates over time. This is a major development in credit scores, since other models to date (including older versions of VantageScore and all existing versions of FICO) only examine the most recently reported billing cycle. So, for example, if a consumer's credit card often reports at or near the credit limit, but the consumer paid his/her balance recently, and it now reflects a $0 balance, most credit scores would look only at the current $0 balance when calculating utilization rates. However, the makers of VantageScore 4.0 believe it is more accurate to look at the consumer's utilization rates over a period of time. This may help or hurt a consumer, depending on their situation. A consumer who has historically used very little of their credit but makes a large one-time purchase and shows a high balance at the time the score is calculated would score better under VantageScore 4.0 than, say, FICO 8, which looks only at the most current billing cycle information.

See also
Alternative data
Comparison of free credit report websites
Criticism of credit scoring systems in the United States

References

External links

Retail financial services
2006 introductions